Oktos–Saint-Quentin was a French professional road cycling team that existed from 1999 until 2004.  

Th team was founded in 1999 as Saint-Quentin–Oktos–MBK, and competed in the third division of professional teams. They had a fairly successful season, with well known riders including Saulius Ruškys and Eddy Seigneur, and upgraded to the second level the following year. The team faced two poor seasons, but were able to remain in the 2nd division. However, they downgraded back to the third for their final season in 2004, despite placing 12th in the ranking the previous season.

UCI rankings

References

Defunct cycling teams based in France
Cycling teams based in France
Cycling teams established in 1999
Cycling teams disestablished in 2004
1999 establishments in France
2004 disestablishments in France